Semani-ye Sofla (also Romanized as Semanī-ye Soflá; also known as Semanī-ye Paeen) is a village in Arabkhaneh Rural District, Shusef District, Nehbandan County, South Khorasan Province, Iran. At the 2006 census, its population was 75, in 22 families.

References 

Populated places in Nehbandan County